Brian Cooley is a Canadian sculptor, specializing in dinosaurs.

Notable work
He produced the fleshed-out head of the Tyrannosaurus rex 'Sue' at the Field Museum of Natural History.

He created several gigantic dinosaurs either climbing into or bursting out of The Children's Museum of Indianapolis, Indiana, including an adult and two juvenile alamosaurs which were installed at the museum June 11, 2004.

Awards
Cooley was the recipient of the Society of Vertebrate Paleontology's John Lanzendorf PaleoArt Prize for 3-dimensional art in 2005.

References

External links

Living people
Canadian sculptors
Canadian male sculptors
Paleoartists
Year of birth missing (living people)